Kismat Konnection (Fate Connection) is an Indian Hindi-language romantic comedy film directed by Aziz Mirza. The film stars Shahid Kapoor and Vidya Balan in the lead roles with Juhi Chawla in a guest appearance. Shah Rukh Khan is the narrator. Produced by Ramesh S. Taurani under the banner of Tips Industries, Kismat Konnection was released on July 18th, 2008. The film was declared a "Semi-Hit" at the box office.

Kismat Konnection is a remake of the Hollywood film, Just My Luck which stars Lindsay Lohan and Chris Pine.

Plot
This is a story about an Architect Raj Malhotra. While he was a top student in his school and college days, he is not having much luck in finding work, clients or projects. All he does, seems to go wrong. Raj Malhotra goes to a Romani people named Haseena Bano Jaan. She advises him that his luck is not good and he needs a Good Luck Charm or a person who can change his life. Afterwards, Raj Malhotra meets Priya Saluja, who is ready to help the citizens of a community by trying to save a Community centre. Although they do not get along at first, Raj Malhotra eventually realizes that Priya Saluja is his lucky charm. Priya Saluja ends up helping Raj Malhotra through sticky situations and Raj Malhotra eventually figures out that she is, in fact, changing his life. Knowing this, Raj Malhotra lies to Priya Saluja by telling her that he will help her save the community center, but instead, he is trying to build a Shopping mall there so he can finally be recognized as an architect. He also falls in love with Priya Saluja and she too falls for him. However, when Priya Saluja finds out the truth about what Raj Malhotra is trying to do, she becomes sad. To make up for his lie, Raj Malhotra sells everything he has, not caring about his job. He proposes a plan to save the community center and ends up winning Priya's love and admiration.

Cast
 Shahid Kapoor as Raj Malhotra
 Vidya Balan as Priya Saluja (Few lines as Mona Ghosh Shetty)
 Juhi Chawla as Haseena Bano Jaan (Guest Appearance)
 Om Puri as Sanjeev "Harry" Gill
 Boman Irani as Rajiv Batra (Priya's Waving Friend)
 Vishal Malhotra as Hiten Patel
 Himani Shivpuri as Mrs. Manpreet Gill
 Karanvir Bohra as Dave Kataria
 Dimple Sharma as Aditi Rao
 Amit Varma as Karan Bahl (Priya's Fiancé)
 Satyanand Gaitonde as Mr. Kabir Talpade
 Gunjan Bakshi as Rita Ghatge
 Hyder Ali as Mr. Rahul Bakshi
 Shah Rukh Khan as a Narrator

Production
Kismat Konnection (in other words "Connection of Fate") was previously titled Lucky Charm. Kapoor and Balan began shooting for the film in Toronto, Canada and later continued in Mumbai. Actress Juhi Chawla played the role of a gypsy fortune-teller dressed in typical colorful bright attire.

Reception
The film received an average rating of 3 out of 5 from the critics. "A simple romantic Kismat Konnection", "which could have been a good romantic comedy, but lack of good one liners, a bit lengthy second half, typical climax makes it fairly average." However Taran Adarsh gave the movie 3 out of 5 calling it a simple and sweet film. He also said the performances by Shahid and Vidya are done very neatly. Noyon Jyoti Parasara of AOL.in also rated it 3.5 out of 5 and said, "Overall, Kismat Konnection bears the stamp of typical Aziz Mirza film. It's not a great story or an extraordinary film. But it's a nice, cute and emotional movie."

Box office
The film registered a very good opening at the box office. The film was released in more than 600 screens worldwide including US, UK, Australia and the Middle East. In the US, it collected  by the second night of its release.

Release
This film was released worldwide on Friday, July 18th, 2008.

Soundtrack

The music was composed by Pritam while lyrics had been written by Sayeed Quadri and Shabbir Ahmed. 'Soniye Ve' was composed by Sajid–Wajid. Remix songs were mixed by DJ Suketu and Aks. According to the Indian trade website Box Office India, with around 10,00,000 units sold, this film's soundtrack album was the year's fifteenth highest-selling. And remixes are connected style from Dance Bowling 90s.

References

External links
 

2008 films
2000s Hindi-language films
Films featuring songs by Pritam
UTV Motion Pictures films